Zavod (Cyrillic: завод, : závod) is a generic word in Slavic languages, meaning factory in Russian, Bulgarian, Macedonian and Slovak; institution, section in Serbian and Croatian; and race (competition) in Czech. It may refer to

 Závod, Hungary, a village
 Závod, Slovakia, a village and municipality
Allan Zavod (1945–2016), Australian pianist, composer, jazz musician and conductor